Cesare Merzagora (9 November 1898 – 1 May 1991) was an Italian politician from Milan.

Biography 
Merzagora was born in Milan on November 9, 1898.

Between 1947 and 1949 Merzagora would serve as Italy's Minister of Foreign Trade. He was President of Banca Popolare di Milano from 1950 to 1952, President of the Italian Senate from 1953 to 1967, and was also temporarily acting head of State, in the period between the resignation of Antonio Segni and the election of Giuseppe Saragat in 1964. Merzagora was named senator for life in March of 1963.

He was run as a candidate of the Italian Christian Democracy Party, and was affiliated to this party for most of his whole political career and then as an independent politician.

He died in Rome on 1 May 1991.

References

External links

|-

|-

1898 births
1991 deaths
Politicians from Milan
Christian Democracy (Italy) politicians
20th-century Italian politicians
Candidates for President of Italy
Presidents of the Italian Senate
Members of the Italian Senate from Lombardy
Members of the National Council (Italy)
Italian life senators
Grand Crosses 1st class of the Order of Merit of the Federal Republic of Germany
Grand Crosses of the Order of Polonia Restituta
Grand Crosses of the Order of the Sun of Peru
Recipients of the War Merit Cross (Italy)
Recipients of the Silver Medal of Military Valor